The cantons of Tours are administrative divisions of the Indre-et-Loire department, in central France. Since the French canton reorganisation which came into effect in March 2015, the city of Tours is subdivided into 4 cantons. Their seat is in Tours.

Cantons

References

Cantons of Indre-et-Loire